Loop 7 is a beltway in the U.S. state of Texas around the town of Athens. The highway additionally serves as a bypass for U.S. Highway 175 (US 175), State Highway 19 (SH 19), and SH 31 around the town.

Route description
Loop 7 officially begins at an interchange with SH 31 (West Corsicana Street) west of downtown Athens. SH 31 overlaps with Loop 7 and the two highways turn northeast before having an interchange with US 175; that highway then joins the overlap as well. The beltway turns towards the east and has an interchange with SH 19; SH 19 joins the beltway. Loop 7 continues to run east with SH 31 leaving at an interchange with Business SH 31 (Bus. SH 31, East Tyler Street). Loop 7 turns south at the interchange and has an interchange with Farm to Market Road 2495 (FM 2495). Loop 7 starts turning southeast with US 175 leaving at an interchange with Bus. US 175 (E. Corsicana Street). After US 175 leaves the beltway, Loop 7 turns west with SH 19 leaving at an interchange with Bus. SH 19 (South Palestine Street). After SH 19 leaves the beltway, Loop 7 travels without any concurrences and has an interchange with FM 59 and FM 2494. After the FM 2494 interchange, Loop 7 turns north before arriving back at its start point with SH 31 (West Corsicana Street).

History

Previous route

Current route
The section of Loop 7 from SH 31 (West Corsicana Street) to FM 317 was originally the westernmost section of FM 317. This portion of FM 317 was redesignated as Loop 7 on January 28, 2005. On May 30, 2013, SH 31 was rerouted around Athens, bypassing the town and overlapping with Loop 7.

Junction list

See also

References

007
Transportation in Henderson County, Texas
Beltways in the United States